See You in Hell may refer to:
See You in Hell (album), a 1984 album by Grim Reaper
"See You in Hell", the title track to Grim Reaper's 1984 album See You in Hell
See You in Hell (Puerto Muerto), a 2004 album by Puerto Muerto
"See You in Hell", a single from the 1998 Monster Magnet album Powertrip
"See You in Hell (Don't Be Late)",  a song by Yngwie Malmsteen from his 1990 album Eclipse